The 2005 WAC men's basketball tournament  was held in the Lawlor Events Center in Reno, Nevada between Tuesday, March 8, and Saturday, March 12.  The winners of the tournament were the #2 seeded UTEP Miners.  This was the final season before the conference was restructured before the 2005–06 season.

Bracket 
All Times Pacific.

References

WAC men's basketball tournament
Tournament
WAC men's basketball tournament
WAC men's basketball tournament